Romário Martins Leitão (born January 16, 1997) is an Olympic long distance runner from São Tomé and Príncipe. He competed at the 2016 Summer Olympics in the men's 5000 metres race, where he finished 25th in his heat. He did not advance to the final.

References

1997 births
Living people
São Tomé and Príncipe male athletes
Olympic athletes of São Tomé and Príncipe
Athletes (track and field) at the 2016 Summer Olympics
People from São Tomé